Agryzkovo is the name of several rural localities in Tver Oblast, Russia:
Agryzkovo, Vyshnevolotsky District, Tver Oblast, a village in Knyashchinskoye Rural Settlement of Vyshnevolotsky District
Agryzkovo, Zapadnodvinsky District, Tver Oblast, a village in Benetskoye Rural Settlement of Zapadnodvinsky District